The Wellington local elections, 2010 are part of the 2010 New Zealand local elections, to elect members to sub-national councils and boards. The Wellington elections cover one regional council (the Greater Wellington Regional Council), eight territorial authority (city and district) councils, three district health boards, and various community boards and licensing trusts.

As per the Local Electoral Act 2001, all the elections will occur on Saturday 9 October 2010. Voting is carried out by postal ballot, using one of two voting systems: Single Transferable Vote for the district health boards and three of the territorial authority councils, and First Past The Post for the remaining territorial authority councils, the regional council, and all the local boards and trusts.

Greater Wellington Regional Council
The Greater Wellington Regional Council (GWRC) is the regional council covering the whole Wellington Region. It represents a population of 478,600 as of the Statistics New Zealand's June 2009 estimate, and consists of thirteen councillors elected from six constituencies (Wellington, Lower Hutt, Porirua-Tawa, Kapiti Coast, Upper Hutt, Wairarapa) using the First Past The Post voting system.

Wellington constituency
The Wellington constituency returns five members to the GWRC. At the close of nominations at 12 noon on 20 August 2010, the candidates nominated for the Wellington constituency were:

Lower Hutt constituency

Porirua-Tawa constituency
The Porirua-Tawa constituency returns two members to the GWRC. At the close of nominations, the candidates nominated for the Porirua-Tawa constituency were:

Kapiti Coast constituency
One member from the Kapiti constituency was elected to GWRC. Incumbent Nigel Wilson retained the seat against former Kapiti Coast District councillor Ann Chapman.

Upper Hutt constituency

Wairarapa constituency
One member from the Wairarapa constituency was elected to GWRC. Former Carterton District Council mayor Gary McPhee won the constituency, defeating incumbent Ian Buchannan.

Territorial authority councils
The Wellington Region contains eight second-tier territorial authority councils in their entirety and a small part of a ninth (Tararua District). The eight councils are Wellington City Council, Hutt City Council, Porirua City Council, Upper Hutt City Council, Kapiti Coast District Council, Masterton District Council, Carterton District Council, and South Wairarapa District Council.

Wellington City Council
The Wellington City Council represents a population of 195,500 as of June 2009, and consists of a mayor and fourteen councillors elected from five wards (Northern, Onslow-Western, Lambton, Eastern, Southern) using the Single Transferable Vote system.

Mayor

One mayor is elected at large from the entire Wellington City Council area. At the close of nominations, the candidates nominated for Mayor were: Celia Wade-Brown won the election in the final round of the single transferable vote count by 24,881 to 24,705. She was ranked ahead of Kerry Prendergast on a significant number of ballots from the four trailing candidates after they were eliminated, which allowed her to overcome Prendergast's lead after the first round of counting (21,809 to 18,560), although Kerry Prendergast was leading by 40 votes before special votes were counted.

Eastern ward
The Eastern ward returns three councillors to the Wellington City Council. The final iteration of results for the ward were:

Lambton Ward
The Lambton ward returns three councillors to the Wellington City Council. The final iteration of results for the ward were:

Northern Ward
The Northern ward returns three councillors to the Wellington City Council. The final iteration of results for the ward were:

Onslow-Western Ward
The Onslow-Western ward returns three councillors to the Wellington City Council. The final iteration of results for the ward were:

Southern Ward
The Southern ward returns two councillors to the Wellington City Council. The final iteration of results for the ward were:

Hutt City Council
The Hutt City Council represents a population of 102,100 as of June 2009, and consists of a mayor and twelve councillors elected from six wards (Central, Eastern, Harbour, Northern, Wainuiomata, Western) elected using the First Past The Post system.

Mayor
One mayor is elected at large from the entire Hutt City Council area. At close of nominations, the candidates nominated for Mayor were:

Central ward
The Central ward returns two councillors to the Hutt City Council. At close of nominations, the candidates nominated for the Central ward were:

Eastern ward
The Eastern ward returns two councillors to the Hutt City Council. At the close of nominations, the candidates nominated for the Eastern ward were:

Harbour ward
The Harbour ward returns two councillors to the Hutt City Council. At the close of nominations, the candidates nominated for the Harbour ward were:

Northern ward
The Northern ward returns two councillors to the Hutt City Council. At the close of nominations, the candidates nominated for the Northern ward were:

Wainuiomata ward
The Wainuiomata ward returns two councillors to the Hutt City Council. At the close of nominations, the candidates nominated for the Wainuiomata ward were:

Western ward
The Western ward returns two councillors to the Hutt City Council. At the close of nominations, the candidates nominated for the Western ward were:

Porirua City Council
The Porirua City Council represents a population of 51,500 as of June 2009, and consists of a mayor and thirteen councillors elected from three wards: Eastern, Northern, and Western, using the Single Transferable Vote system.

Mayor
One mayor is elected at large from the entire Porirua City Council area. At the close of nominations, the candidates nominated for Mayor were:

Eastern ward
The Eastern ward returns five councillors to the Porirua City Council. At the close of nominations, the candidates nominated for the Eastern ward were:

Northern ward
The Northern ward returns five councillors to the Porirua City Council. At the close of nominations, the candidates nominated for the Northern ward were:

Western ward
The Western ward returns three councillors to the Porirua City Council. At the close of nominations, the candidates nominated for the Western ward are:

Upper Hutt City Council
The Upper Hutt City Council represents a population of 40,600 as of June 2009, and consists of a mayor and ten councillors elected using the First Past the Post system.

Mayor
One mayor is elected at large from the entire Upper Hutt City Council area. At the close of nominations, the candidates nominated for Mayor were:

Councillors at large
Ten councillors are elected at large from the entire Upper Hutt City Council area. At the close of nominations, the candidates nominated for Councillors at large were:

Kāpiti Coast District Council

Mayor
One mayor is elected at large from the entire Kāpiti Coast District Council area. At the close of nominations, the candidates nominated for Mayor are:

Councillors at large
Five councillors are elected at large from the entire Kāpiti Coast District Council area. At the close of nominations, the candidates nominated for Councillors at large were:

Ōtaki ward
The Ōtaki ward returns one councillor to the Kāpiti Coast District Council. At the close of nominations, the candidates nominated for the Ōtaki ward were:

Paekākāriki-Raumati ward
The Paekākāriki-Raumati ward returns one councillor to the Kāpiti Coast District Council. At the close of nominations, the candidates nominated for the Paekākāriki-Raumati ward were:

Paraparaumu ward
The Paraparaumu ward returns two councillors to the Kāpiti Coast District Council. At the close of nominations, the candidates nominated for the Paraparaumu ward were:

Waikanae ward
The Waikanae ward returns one councillor to the Kāpiti Coast District Council. At the close of nominations the, candidates nominated for the Waikanae ward were:

Masterton District Council
The Masterton District Council represents a population of 23,300 as of July 2009, and consists of a mayor, five councillors elected at large, and five councillors elected from two wards: Rural and Urban, using the First Past the Post system.

Mayor
One mayor is elected at large from the entire Masterton District Council area. At the close of nominations, the candidates nominated for Mayor are:

Councillors at large
Five councillors are elected at large from the entire Masterton District Council area. At the close of nominations, the candidates nominated for Councillors at large were:

Rural ward
The Rural ward returns one councillor to the Masterton District Council. At the close of nominations, the candidates nominated for the Rural ward were:

Urban ward
The Urban ward returns four councillors to the Masterton District Council. At the close of nominations, the candidates nominated for Councillors at large were:

Carterton District Council

South Wairarapa District Council

References 

2010 elections in New Zealand
Local elections in New Zealand
Politics of the Wellington Region
2010s in Wellington